Sympistis nigrita is a moth of the family Noctuidae. The nominate subspecies is found in the Northern part of Europe.

The wingspan is 22–25 mm(.8661-.9843in).

The larvae feed on Dryas octopetala.

Subspecies
Sympistis nigrita nigrita (central Europe)
Sympistis nigrita zetterstedtii (northern Eurasia and into northwestern North America)
Sympistis nigrita kolthoffi (Alaska and Yukon)

External links
Fauna Europaea
Lepiforum.de

nigrita
Moths of Europe
Moths of North America
Taxa named by Jean Baptiste Boisduval
Moths described in 1840